During the Roman Republic, there were watchmen that served as firefighters. They used water buckets to put out fires and axes to tear down buildings near the fire in order to prevent the fire from spreading. The aediles and tresviri nocturni were also employed to fight fires. Roman Emperor Augustus created the Vigiles. The Vigiles were an organization of freedmen that fought fires. They would use buckets and water pumps. Emperor Nero also created "bucket brigades" to help fight fires.

Organization and history 
Most ancient Roman cities had no firefighting organizations or equipment dedicated to fighting fires. There were early groups of watchmen who used buckets of water to put out fires. During the Roman Republic, there were several organizations dedicated to firefighting. These were the tresviri nocturni, and the aediles also helped put out fires. The tresviri nocturni, later known as tresviri capitales, had a small group of slaves which would fight fires. Sometimes, in particularly dire situations, a consul would be called to fight fires. Tribunes may also have been involved. Some wealthy individuals would form their own personal fire brigades. An aedile by the name of Egnatius Rufus created a band of slaves that were tasked with putting out fires. His motivation was either to help the Roman people or to gain political status.  In 21 BC, Augustus reorganized Rufus' slaves, creating a new group of 600 slaves led by the aediles. Eventually, Augustus created a fire brigade called the Vigiles Urbani in 6 AD. The Vigiles numbered 7,000 men, and were divided into cohorts of 1,000 men. Each cohort was responsible for two regions. Overall, the Vigiles were commanded by an equestrian called the praefectus vigilum. Nero would later create bucket brigades to patrol the streets of Rome.

Pliny wrote about the need for fire fighting organizations.

Trajan, the emperor at the time responded by saying:

Methods 
Fires would be fought by filling buckets with water and then throwing them against fire. Firefighters could also use axes to destroy buildings in order to prevent them from catching fire. Once a house caught fire, Crassus would send his slaves to fight the fire. Once they arrived at the house, they would only put out the fire if the owner of the house sold the building to Crassus. Crassus would then sell the house back to the original owner at a marked up price.

The imperial-era Vigiles would patrol the streets of Rome looking for fires. They would uses axes, catapults, or ballistae to destroy buildings near a fire to prevent the fire from spreading. It is possible this is the origin of the phrase "hook and ladder". The Vigiles could also use buckets and water pumps.

References 

History of firefighting
Firefighting
History of the Roman Republic